The 2021-22 Wisconsin Badgers men's ice hockey season was the 74th season of play for the program and 22nd in the Big Ten. They Badgers represented the University of Wisconsin–Madison in the 2022–23 NCAA Division I men's ice hockey season. They were coached by Tony Granato in his seventh season and played their home games at Kohl Center.

Season
After an abysmal season, Wisconsin was hoping for a resurgence in 2023. Unfortunately for the Badgers, this season the Big Ten was the strongest conference in the nation, boasting upwards of 6 teams ranked in the top 20. Wisconsin was the odd man out and though they did see improvements on both the offensive and defensive side of the puck, it wasn't enough to keep them out of the conference cellar. From the start of the season the Badgers had to face a murderer's row of opponents and played their first 8 games against ranked teams. While they did win two of those games, both were against non-conference competition and only marginally helped the team's cause.

Wisconsin managed to put together a 5-game winning streak in the middle of the season but four of those victories came against two of the lowest-ranked teams in the country and the team followed that up by going 3–11 over the next fourteen games. It wasn't really until the end of the regular season that the Badgers showed any signs of life when they managed to split three consecutive series, all against ranked teams. While it didn't help they at all in regards to their playoff position, it did at least show that they had the potential to make waves in the conference tournament.

In the postseason meeting at Michigan, the Badger's offense show up and scored 9 goals in two games. However, the defense was porous and allowed the Wolverines to score 13 goals. 

Shortly after the end of the season, head coach Tony Granato was relieved of his position. The move did not come as a surprise to Granato, who said:
“Based on the end of last year, I knew we had to win this year,”

It was the fifth losing season for the Badgers under Granato in seven years.

Departures

Recruiting

Roster
As of September 8, 2022.

Standings

Schedule and results

|-
!colspan=12 style=";" | Exhibition

|-
!colspan=12 style=";" | Regular Season

|-
!colspan=12 style=";" | 

|-
!colspan=12 style=";" | Regular Season

|-
!colspan=12 style=";" |

Scoring statistics

Goaltending statistics

Rankings

Note: USCHO did not release a poll in weeks 1, 13, or 26.

References

External links

2022-23
Wisconsin Badgers
Wisconsin Badgers
Wisconsin Badgers
Wisconsin Badgers